"Hole in the Earth" is a song by the American alternative metal band Deftones. The song was released as the first single from their fifth album, Saturday Night Wrist, and appeared as the album's opening track.

Reception
"Hole in the Earth" was released to radio airplay on September 12, 2006. It charted relatively well, peaking at No. 18 and No. 19 in Billboard's Alternative Songs and Hot Mainstream Rock Tracks charts, respectively, and in 69th position in the UK Singles Chart.

Music video
A music video was filmed for the single, directed by Brian Lazzaro.

Appearances in other media
The song was released as downloadable content for Guitar Hero III: Legends of Rock on March 6, 2008, and for Rock Band, Rock Band 2 and Rock Band 3 on June 8, 2010. It was also featured in the video game Saints Row 2.

A remix of the song was produced by Danny Lohner for the soundtrack album of the film Underworld: Rise of the Lycans, released January 13, 2009.

The song was also featured during one of the scenes in the 2013 black comedy film This Is the End.

Track listing

Personnel
Deftones
Chino Moreno - lead vocals, rhythm guitar
Stephen Carpenter - lead guitar
Chi Cheng - bass, backing vocals
Frank Delgado - keyboards
Abe Cunningham - drums
Production
Produced by Bob Ezrin
Pro Tools Engineering by Ryan Gorman
Mixed by Ryan Williams

Chart performance

References

Deftones songs
2006 songs
2006 singles
Songs written by Abe Cunningham
Songs written by Chino Moreno
Songs written by Chi Cheng (musician)
Songs written by Stephen Carpenter
Songs written by Frank Delgado (American musician)
Maverick Records singles